Mount Wood a mountain in the Philippines. It is located in Occidental Mindoro and the Mimaropa region, in the north of the country, 210 km south of the national capital Manila.

References

Wood
Landforms of Occidental Mindoro